Sancus is a genus of skippers in the family Hesperiidae. The name is considered a junior synonym of the monotypic genus Psolos Staudinger, 1889 non Semper, 1892 nec Watson, 1893.

References
Natural History Museum Lepidoptera genus database

Hesperiidae
Hesperiidae genera